John Edmund "Chooka" Howell (31 August 1924 – 12 June 1994), nicknamed "Chooka" (as was his father) from his distinctive gait, was an Australian rules footballer in the Victorian Football League (VFL).

Three generations of grand final players 
He has the distinction of being a member of the only three-generation set of participants in a VFL/AFL Grand Final.

His father Jack P. "Chooka" Howell played for South Melbourne, against Collingwood, in the 1918 Grand Final.

This Jack "Chooka" Howell played for Carlton, against Essendon, in the 1947 Grand Final.

His son, Scott Howell played for Carlton, against Collingwood, in the 1981 Grand Final.

External links
 
 
 Jack Howell's playing statistics from The VFA Project
 Blueseum Biography Jack "Chooka" Howell

1924 births
1994 deaths
Australian rules footballers from Melbourne
Australian Rules footballers: place kick exponents
Carlton Football Club players
Carlton Football Club Premiership players
John Nicholls Medal winners
Oakleigh Football Club players
Oakleigh Football Club coaches
Chelsea Football Club (Australia) players
All-Australians (1953–1988)
One-time VFL/AFL Premiership players
People from the City of Hobsons Bay